Albert Smith White (October 24, 1803 – September 4, 1864) was a United States senator from Indiana, a United States representative from Indiana and a United States district judge of the United States District Court for the District of Indiana.

Education and career

Born on October 24, 1803, in Blooming Grove, Orange County, New York, White graduated from Union College in 1822 and read law in 1825. He was admitted to the bar and entered private practice in New York from 1825 and 1829. He continued private practice in Lafayette, Indiana, from 1829 to 1836. He was an assistant clerk for the Indiana House of Representatives from 1830 to 1831. He was a candidate for the United States House of Representatives from Indiana in 1832. He was clerk of the Indiana House of Representatives from 1832 to 1835. He was a Presidential Elector on the Whig ticket in 1836.

Congressional service

White was elected as a Whig from Indiana's 7th congressional district to the United States House of Representatives of the 25th United States Congress, serving from March 4, 1837, to March 3, 1839. He was not a candidate for renomination in 1838. He was elected as a Whig to the United States Senate and served from March 4, 1839, to March 3, 1845. He declined to be a candidate for reelection. He was chairman of the United States Senate Committee to Audit and Control the Contingent Expenses in the 27th United States Congress and chairman of the United States Senate Committee on Indian Affairs in the 27th and 28th United States Congresses.

Later career

Following his departure from the Senate, White resumed private practice in Stockwell, Indiana, from 1845 to 1861, also serving as president of several railroads during that time period, including the Indianapolis and La Fayette Railroad and the Wabash and Western Railway.

Later congressional service

White was elected as a Republican from Indiana's 8th congressional district to the United States House of Representatives of the 37th United States Congress, serving from March 4, 1861, to March 3, 1863. He was not a candidate for renomination in 1862. He was appointed by President Lincoln as one of three commissioners to adjust the claims of citizens of Minnesota and the Dakota Territory against the United States Government for Indian depredations, relating to a Sioux Indian Massacre occurring in 1862.

Federal judicial service

White was nominated by President Abraham Lincoln on January 14, 1864, to a seat on the United States District Court for the District of Indiana vacated by Judge Caleb Blood Smith. He was confirmed by the United States Senate on January 18, 1864, and received his commission the same day. His service terminated on September 4, 1864, seven and a half months after his appointment. He was interred in Greenbush Cemetery in Lafayette.

References

Sources

 
 

1803 births
1864 deaths
United States senators from Indiana
Members of the Indiana House of Representatives
1836 United States presidential electors
Indiana lawyers
New York (state) lawyers
19th-century American railroad executives
Union College (New York) alumni
People from Lafayette, Indiana
People from Orange County, New York
People of Indiana in the American Civil War
Judges of the United States District Court for the District of Indiana
United States federal judges appointed by Abraham Lincoln
19th-century American judges
Indiana Whigs
Whig Party United States senators
Whig Party members of the United States House of Representatives
Woodhull family
19th-century American politicians
Republican Party members of the United States House of Representatives from Indiana